Ozyptila westringi is a crab spider species found in Sweden, Netherlands and Germany.

References

External links 

westringi
Spiders of Europe
Spiders described in 1873